Ostandar or Ustandar was an administrative title wielded by provincial governors under the Sasanian Empire. They governed the royal lands, known as the ostan. The title was later assumed by the Baduspanids of Ruyan, starting with Shahriyar III ibn Jamshid.

References

Sources 
 
 
 
 

Sasanian military offices
Officials of the Sasanian Empire
Baduspanids
Persian words and phrases